(–)-2β-Carbophenoxy-3β-(p-tolyl)tropane (RTI-4229-120) is a phenyltropane derivative which acts as a reasonably selective dopamine reuptake inhibitor, along with weaker inhibition of noradrenaline and serotonin reuptake. It has a reasonably fast rate of occupancy of dopamine transporters in the brain, though slower than that of cocaine itself. RTI-120 has a short duration of action, along with other p-methyl substituted phenyltropanes such as RTI-150, RTI-171 and RTI-199, giving it a more similar pharmacological profile to cocaine compared to longer acting analogues like RTI-121 and RTI-177.

See also
 List of phenyltropanes
 RTI-113

References 

Tropanes
RTI compounds
Dopamine reuptake inhibitors